Chiljip Psy-da is the sixth studio album and seventh major release by South Korean singer Psy. The album was released on December 1, 2015, by KT Music, YG Entertainment, School Boy, and Republic. The lead singles included "Daddy" and "Napal Baji".

Background

Psy originally released the title of the album during a streaming on V Live on November 24, 2015. The title and album cover is a parody of a Korean soft drink Chilsung Cider by Lotte Chilsung.

Songs and composition 
In the press conference, Psy stated that the single "Napal Baji" is a "fresh sounding retro style funk track with heavy drums and rhythmic guitar lines of the 70s and 80s". Regarding the two singles, he explained that "Daddy" was produced with the international market in mind, while "Napal Baji" was produced mainly for the interest of the domestic market.

Several songs on the album were described by Psy as parallels to several of his older works, including "Dance Jockey" with his 2003 hit "Champion" and "I Remember You" with his 2012 track "What Would Have Been?". Regarding the song "Dream", Psy said that he called Kim Jun-su because he was inspired from his performances. A tribute to the late Korean singer Shin Hae-chul, the lyrics are based on "talks with him about philosophy and death while drinking with him" which he wondered if "maybe all our entire lives are a dream". The profits from the song were donated to his family.

Track listing

Notes

Charts

References

2015 albums
Korean-language albums
Psy albums
YG Entertainment albums
Genie Music albums